Barnes Run (also known as Barnes Run Creek) is a tributary of Black Creek in Luzerne County, Pennsylvania. The stream has been used as a water supply for portions of Hazleton and some surrounding areas. It is designated as a Coldwater Fishery and wild trout naturally reproduce within it.

Course
Barnes Run begins on the northern side of a mountain in Black Creek Township. It flows west for several tenths of a mile before turning north for nearly a mile. After several tenths of a mile, it leaves the mountain and crosses Rock Glen Road. The stream then turns west-northwest for several tenths of a mile, passing near the Sugarloaf Golf Course and flowing through a series of ponds. A short distance downstream of the ponds, it reaches its confluence with Black Creek.

Geography and geology
Barnes Run is in the ridge and valley physiographic province.

Watershed
Barnes Run is entirely within the United States Geological Survey quadrangle of Nuremberg. The stream is not considered to be a major stream.

The Pennsylvania Department of Environmental Protection opted not to recognize the watershed of Barnes Run as a "high quality watershed" with the potential to be affected by development. One proposed route for the Susquehanna-Roseland 500 kV Transmission Line crosses Barnes Run.

Barnes Run is one of eleven officially named streams in the watershed of Nescopeck Creek that has not been assessed by the Pennsylvania Fish and Boat Commission.

History
Barnes Run was entered into the Geographic Names Information System on January 1, 1990. Its identifier in the Geographic Names Information System is 1202218. The stream was added because of its appearance on the Atlas of the Anthracite Coalfields of Pennsylvania, which was published in 1888.

The Barnes Run Reservoir was constructed in 1912. It is dammed by an earth dam with a masonry core wall and a cut-stone spillway. In 1964, it was noted in the Standard-Speaker that the reservoir rarely ran dry.

Barnes Run has been one of several streams used as a water supply in Hazleton. It and two other streams (Wolffs Run and Stony Creek) supplied water to as many as 14,400 people in 1974. In the early 1900s, Barnes Run and Wolffs Run made up 25 percent of the water supply of Hazleton. In 1963, Barnes Run was one of ten suppliers of water to Hazleton. It also supplied water to West Hazleton and Humboldt.

Biology
Barnes Run is designated as a Coldwater Fishery. Wild trout naturally reproduce in Barnes Run from its headwaters downstream to its mouth. The Pennsylvania Fish and Boat Commission considered adding the stream to its list of Wild Trout Waters in a meeting on April 11 and April 12, 2012.

Giardia cysts were observed in the Barnes Run Reservoir in February 1986.

See also
Scotch Run (Black Creek), next tributary of Black Creek going downstream
Falls Run, next tributary of Black Creek going upstream
List of rivers of Pennsylvania

References

Rivers of Luzerne County, Pennsylvania
Tributaries of Nescopeck Creek
Rivers of Pennsylvania